Paul Wentworth (1533–1593), a prominent English member of parliament (1559, 1563 and 1572) in the reign of Elizabeth I, was a member of the Lillingstone Lovell branch of the family.

Life
His father Sir Nicholas Wentworth (died 1557) was chief porter of Calais. Paul Wentworth was of Puritan sympathies, and he first came into notice by the freedom with which in 1566 he criticized Elizabeth's prohibition of discussion in parliament on the question of her successor.

Paul, who was probably the author of the famous puritan devotional book The Miscellanie, or Regestrie and Methodicall Directorie of Orizons (London, 1615), died in 1593. He became possessed of Burnham Abbey through his wife, to whose first husband, William Tyldesley, it had been granted at the dissolution of the monasteries by Henry VIII.

His brother Peter Wentworth was also a prominent Puritan. The significance of both Paul and Peter Wentworth has in the past been exaggerated. In reality, although they did contend for freedom of speech (for which they were both imprisoned), neither had any impact. Graves refers to them as "standard bearers without an army" as they had no significant following.

References

1533 births
1593 deaths
Members of the pre-1707 English Parliament for constituencies in Cornwall
Paul
English religious writers
16th-century English writers
16th-century male writers
16th-century Protestants
English MPs 1559
English MPs 1563–1567
English MPs 1572–1583
English male non-fiction writers